Lethocerus indicus is a giant water bug in the family Belostomatidae, native to South and Southeast Asia, as well as southeast China, the Ryukyu Islands, and New Guinea. It was originally described as Belostoma indicum but is no longer placed in that genus.

This insect is well known as an edible species in a number of different Southeast Asian cuisines. The taste of the flight muscles is often compared to sweet scallops or shrimp.

Description
The Asian region has several species of Belostomatidae including L. patruelis, L. insulanus, L. indicus, and Kirkaldyia deyrolli. Lethocerus insulanus is found along the islands of Southeast Asia to northern Australia and has a medial dark stripe between the light stripes of the pronotum while patruelis (found from southern Europe to Myanmar) has narrower light stripes and the first tarsomere on the foreleg is longer than the claw (almost equal in L. indicus). Kirkaldyia deyrolli is paler and lacks pronotal stripes. The genus Kirkaldyia can be distinguished from Lethocerus by more widely separated eyes, and the presence of two asymmetrical furrows on the inner setal pad of the fore femur.

The species is distributed widely in peninsular India, Sri Lanka, Bangladesh, into Southeast Asia, extending east to Taiwan and south along Sumatra, Java, Indonesia, Philippines and parts of western Papua New Guinea. 

Glands in the abdomen produce odorous chemicals that include (E)-2-hexenyl acetate, (E)-2-hexenyl butanoate, 1-undecen-3-one, 3-mercaptohexyl acetate, and 3-mercapto-1-hexanol which may have a role as an attractant particularly in males. The first two are said to impart a sweet banana-like smell.

Research
The large size of this insect and its flight muscles and the ease of dissection makes it an excellent model organism for muscle structure with special features pertinent to the cardiac muscle. The high degree of structural order makes is possible to obtain X-ray diffraction patterns richer and more detailed than those from vertebrate striated muscle.

As food

Vietnam
The Vietnamese call this insect cà cuống. It is a highly prized food and often boiled and fried whole.
The insect's essence (a pheromone produced by the male that attracts females) is harvested by collecting its liquid-producing sacs. That liquid is then placed in small glass containers. The insect is claimed to be scarce, and demand for the extract is high. Most of the cà cuống essence on the market is therefore imitation, with the actual essence fetching a high price. Cà cuống is typically used sparsely and eaten with bánh cuốn (rice noodle rolls) by adding a drop to the nước chấm (dipping sauce).

It is also eaten in a soup dish called 'bún thang' adding a unique essence to the broth. The dish traditionally includes rice noodles, thinly sliced egg crepe, pork cold cuts, and other various additions in a chicken/dry squid broth. A tiny drop of the extract on the tip of a toothpick would suffice to flavor the whole bowl of soup. This dish originated in Northern Vietnam.

Thailand
In the northeast region of Thailand, eating insects is common. In other parts of Thailand, including the Central and Southern regions, the aromatic essence from this species of insect, known as malaeng da, malaeng da na or maeng da na, is also popular. The water bug can be eaten whole and fried, and as an extract. Malaeng da is used to make nam phrik malaeng Da, a type of chili sauce used as a condiment.

Philippines
In the Ilocos region in the northern part (Luzon) of the Philippines some insects such as crickets, locusts, and beetles are traditionally eaten. The water bug or water beetle is known as alukap in Ilokano language. It is sauteed or fried in oil, garlic, onions and tomatoes, or roasted, after the wings and legs have been removed, and eaten as a viand for steamed rice or as a finger food with liquor. The same is done in the Visayas region where it is called obus in the Visayan language.

See also
List of Thai ingredients

Bibliography
Gene DeFoliart of food-insects.com
 Bekyarova, T. I., Baumann, B. A .J., Reedy, M. C., Tregear, R. T., Ward, A., Krzic, U., Prince, K. M., Reconditi, M., Gore, D., Irving, T. C., and Reedy, M. K. "Crossbridges as Passive Brakes: Reverse Actin Sliding Triggers Strong Myosin Binding That Moves Tropomyosin"PNAS 105:10372-10377 (2008).

References

External links

Hemiptera of Asia
Edible insects
Vietnamese cuisine
Thai cuisine
Philippine cuisine
Belostomatidae